Heser is a genus of ground spiders that was first described by T. K. Tuneva in 2004.

Species
 it contains eleven species, two from North America:
Heser aradensis (Levy, 1998) – Israel
Heser bernardi (Marinaro, 1967) – Spain, Algeria
Heser bonneti (Marinaro, 1967) – Algeria
Heser hierosolymitanus (Levy, 1998) – Israel
Heser hispanus Senglet, 2012 – Spain
Heser infumatus (O. Pickard-Cambridge, 1872) – Tanzania, Egypt, Israel
Heser malefactor Tuneva, 2004 (type) – Kazakhstan
Heser nilicola (O. Pickard-Cambridge, 1874) – Mediterranean, Canary Is. Introduced to USA, Mexico
Heser schmitzi (Kulczyński, 1899) – Spain, Madeira, Canary Is. Introduced to USA
Heser stoevi Deltshev, 2016 – Turkmenistan
Heser vijayanagara Bosselaers, 2010 – India

References

Araneomorphae genera
Gnaphosidae
Spiders of Africa
Spiders of Asia
Spiders of North America